Koen Garritsen (born 25 March 1983) is a retired Dutch football midfielder.

References

1983 births
Living people
Dutch footballers
AGOVV Apeldoorn players
Fortuna Sittard players
PEC Zwolle players
De Treffers players
Eerste Divisie players
Association football midfielders
Netherlands youth international footballers
Netherlands under-21 international footballers